Ben Wizner (born 1971) is an American lawyer, writer, and civil liberties advocate with the American Civil Liberties Union. Since July 2013, he has been the lead attorney of NSA whistleblower Edward Snowden.

Education and personal life
Wizner was born in 1971 in New Haven, Connecticut, and grew up on the campus of Yale University, where his father, Stephen Wizner, is a professor of law at Yale Law School and his mother is a dean. He has described being drawn to social justice work from at least as early as high school; after graduating Harvard College in 1993, he worked for an organization that provided legal assistance to homeless and near-homeless people. At New York University School of Law, he planned to work in legal services for impoverished communities, and on capital punishment cases. After graduating, he clerked for judge Stephen Reinhardt of the United States Court of Appeals for the Ninth Circuit.

Career
Wizner began working for the American Civil Liberties Union in Los Angeles in August 2001, initially focusing on prison reform. Following the September 11 attacks, Wizner's focus shifted to civil liberties issues relating to U.S. national security. Around 2004, he moved to the ACLU's headquarters in New York City. There, he argued legal cases relating to airport security, government watchlists, surveillance practices, targeted killing, extraordinary rendition, and torture. He made several trips to the Guantanamo Bay detention camp. Many of the cases Wizner took were dismissed; he later commented that "on the worst days, I believed that what we were doing ... wasn't litigation in the traditional sense. It wasn't trying to get a court to do something, it was creating a record so that ... people would be able to look back and decide whether it had been the right decision or a disastrous decision."

Starting in 2005, Wizner represented Khalid El-Masri, a German citizen arrested while travelling in Macedonia on suspicion of links to Al Qaeda, who was held by the CIA at a black site in Afghanistan for five months, despite evidence that he was the wrong person. El-Masri's suit was dismissed in the U.S. on grounds of state secrecy, though the CIA ultimately admitted to making a mistake, in a report released by the U.S. Senate. The European Court of Human Rights ruled against Macedonia in the case.

In 2011, Wizner became director of the ACLU's Speech, Privacy, and Technology Project.

Wizner is an adjunct professor at New York University School of Law. He is a contributor to the website Lawfare, has written for Time, the Freedom of the Press Foundation, and several other media outlets, and has testified before the U.S. Congress. He has regularly appeared on television news and analysis programs, including Democracy Now!, Meet the Press, and Politicking with Larry King.

Work with Snowden
In 2013, Edward Snowden contacted journalist Glenn Greenwald and filmmaker Laura Poitras, longtime acquaintances of Wizner, about releasing classified information on NSA programs. Poitras consulted with Wizner before travelling to meet Snowden in Hong Kong. Greenwald later put Wizner into contact with Snowden in July 2013, when Snowden was stranded in the transit zone in Moscow, his passport having been revoked by the U.S. Government. Wizner and Snowden exchanged encrypted communications during this time.

Snowden's legal team also includes Jesselyn Radack, an advocate for whistleblowers; Wolfgang Kaleck, a European attorney; and attorneys with expertise in criminal and asylum law. The team works pro bono to ensure Snowden's continued freedom and ability to contribute to the public conversation he began with his disclosures. Wizner describes being a "gatekeeper" of media requests for Snowden. He has said that he believes Snowden will return to the U.S. eventually.

Wizner has called the Snowden case "the work of a lifetime" and "not traditional legal work, by any means". He had previously spent a decade trying to bring cases against U.S. intelligence agencies, with these cases often dismissed for lack of standing. With Snowden's revelations about Verizon delivering metadata to the U.S. government, the ACLU had standing to sue.

As a result of his work with Snowden, the New York Times Magazine declared that Wizner "has become a figure of not insignificant geopolitical importance."

Public comments
Wizner has defended a right to privacy, and has been critical of the use of extensive surveillance to enforce law. He has highlighted the role of lawbreaking in positive social change, pointing to the LGBT civil rights movement and drug prohibition as areas where illegal activities have contributed to positive changes in the law and public opinion. In speaking on the U.S. intelligence apparatus, he has said that "the NSA is not uniquely evil, it's uniquely capable."

Wizner has forcefully defended Snowden against calls for his punishment, stating that he broke the law for the public good, and noting that no elected officials have been held criminally liable for torture and other human rights violations since 9/11.
 	
Following the April 2019 arrest of WikiLeaks founder Julian Assange in London's Ecuadorian Embassy, Ben Wizner said that if authorities were to prosecute Assange "for violating U.S. secrecy laws [it] would set an especially dangerous precedent for U.S. journalists, who routinely violate foreign secrecy laws to deliver information vital to the public's interest."

References

American Civil Liberties Union people
American civil rights lawyers
Edward Snowden
21st-century American lawyers
Harvard College alumni
New York University School of Law alumni
1971 births
Living people